Mount Vernon is the Virginia estate of George Washington, the first President of the United States.

Mount Vernon or Mont Vernon may also refer to:

Places

Australia
Mount Vernon, New South Wales, a suburb of Sydney, Australia

Canada
 Mount Vernon, a neighbourhood in Brant, Ontario
 Mount Vernon, a neighbourhood in Malahide, Ontario
 Mount Vernon, an unincorporated community in Lot 62, Prince Edward Island

United Kingdom
 Mount Vernon, Belfast
 Mount Vernon, Glasgow, a residential area in the east end of the city

United States

Mount Vernon, Alabama, a town in Mobile County
Mount Vernon, Arkansas, a town in Faulkner County
Mount Vernon, Georgia, a city in Montgomery County
Mount Vernon, Whitfield County, Georgia
Mount Vernon, Illinois, a city in Jefferson County
Mount Vernon, Indiana, the county seat of Posey County
Mount Vernon, Wabash County, Indiana
Mount Vernon, Iowa, a city in Linn County
Mount Vernon, Kentucky, a home rule-class city and county seat of Rockcastle County
Mount Washington, Kentucky, a city originally known as Mount Vernon
Mount Vernon, Maine, a town in Kennebec County
Mount Vernon, Baltimore, Maryland, a neighborhood
Mount Vernon, Maryland, a CDP in Somerset County
Mount Vernon, Missouri, the county seat of Lawrence County
Mont Vernon, New Hampshire (note slight spelling difference), a town in Hillsborough County
Mount Vernon, Erie County, New York, a hamlet
Mount Vernon, New York, a city in Westchester County
Mount Vernon, Ohio, the county seat of Knox County
Mount Vernon, Columbus, Ohio, a neighborhood
Mount Vernon, Oregon, a city in Grant County
Mount Vernon, South Dakota, a city in Davison County
Mount Vernon, Texas, the county seat of Franklin County
Mount Vernon, Virginia, a CDP in Fairfax County
Mount Vernon, Washington, the county seat of Skagit County
Mount Vernon Square, in Washington D.C.
Mount Vernon, West Virginia, an unincorporated community in Putnam County
Mount Vernon, Wisconsin, an unincorporated community in Dane County
Mount Vernon Township (disambiguation)

Geographic features
Mount Vernon, Singapore, a small hill in central Singapore
Mount Vernon, an Anglicised name of the highest point in the Verno mountains, Greece

Transportation stations
Mount Vernon station (Light RailLink), Baltimore, Maryland
Mount Vernon East station, Mount Vernon, New York along the New Haven Line
Mount Vernon North railway station, Glasgow, Scotland
Mount Vernon railway station, Glasgow, Scotland
Mount Vernon Square station, a stop on the Yellow and Green lines of the Washington Metro
Mount Vernon West station, Mount Vernon, New York along the Harlem Line
Skagit Station, in Mount Vernon, Washington.

Institutions
 Mount Vernon Hospital, Northwood, London, United Kingdom
 Mount Vernon Hospital, Barnsley, United Kingdom
 Mount Vernon Nazarene University, a Christian liberal arts college in Mount Vernon, Ohio.
 Mount Vernon, a campus of George Washington University in Washington, D.C.

Ships
USS Mount Vernon (1859), a steamer
USS Mount Vernon (AP-22), an ocean liner purchased by the U.S. Navy for use as a troop transport in 1941
USS Mount Vernon (ID-4508), an ocean liner commandeered and commissioned by the U.S. Navy for use as a troop transport in 1917
USS Mount Vernon (LSD-39), a dock landing ship commissioned in 1972
USS Mount Washington (1846) or USS Mount Vernon, a side wheel gunboat

Other uses
Mount Vernon (Woodleaf, North Carolina), U.S., a historic plantation house, farm complex, and national historic district
Mount Vernon, a dedication to the English Vice-Admiral Edward Vernon
Order of Mount Vernon, University of Washington society
Mount Vernon Conference, 1785
Mount Vernon Station (Western Australia), a pastoral lease

See also 
Mount Vernon High School (disambiguation), several different schools
Mount Vernon Township (disambiguation)